Stars Are Rising is the debut album by British soprano Joanna Forest, which was released on 10 March 2017, and went straight to Number One in the Official Classical Album Charts .

Production
The album was recorded in Prague and London with the City of Prague Philharmonic Orchestra and Arts Symphonic Orchestra. It was arranged, conducted and produced by Robert Emery and co-produced by Moritz Schneider on behalf of Arts Festivals.

Track listing
"Sposa Son Disprezzata" – 3:39
"Un Amore Per Sempre" – 4:30
"Life on Mars" – 4:13
"How Does It Feel?" – 4:22
"My Everything" – 3:52
"Don't Quit" – 3:55
"May the Lord Bless You and Keep You" – 3:38
"Pure Imagination" – 4:34
"Out of the Stillness" – 2:26
"Il Viaggio" – 4:15
"In My Life" – 3:44
"Pathways" – 2:52

References

2017 debut albums
Joanna Forest albums